Stoke is a small village  in northwest Hampshire. At the 2011 Census the population of the village was included in the civil parish of St Mary Bourne.

History
The 1894 OS map indicates Stoke was a very small village, perhaps qualifying as a hamlet. Two farms are listed: Hopgoods and Summerbee. Additionally, there is a Methodist chapel, the "White Hart" public house and a moderate number of further dwellings,
The White Hart pub remains extant, however the days it is open are significantly limited. Arguably, it should be considered a private house, that is occasionally used as a service venue.
There are eight grade two listed buildings in Stoke, although the number of historic houses is far greater. As with many villages in the area, there are a large number of thatched houses in the vernacular style.

Governance
The village is part of the civil parish of St Mary Bourne and is part of the Burghclere, Highclere and St. Mary Bourne ward of Basingstoke and Deane borough council. The borough council is a Non-metropolitan district of Hampshire County Council.

References 

Villages in Hampshire
Basingstoke and Deane